Argyresthia aurulentella is a moth of the family Yponomeutidae. It is found in Northern Europe, Central Europe, western Russia and Macedonia.

The wingspan is 7–9 mm. The moth flies from July to August..

The larvae feed on Juniperus communis.

References

Notes
The flight season refers to Belgium and the Netherlands. This may vary in other parts of the range.

Moths described in 1849
Argyresthia
Moths of Europe